En Garde! is a hybrid role-playing and tactical dueling game published by Game Designers' Workshop (GDW) in 1975 that simulates the swashbuckling world of the Three Musketeers and Cyrano de Bergerac in 17th century Paris.

Gameplay
Each player takes on the role of a gentleman duelist, rolling three dice to determine their character's Strength, Constitution and Expertise, which all come into play during a duel. In addition, the player makes a series of die rolls to determine class, sibling rank, the father's position (which has an effect on monthly allowance) and title (if any). Adding a name to the character completes the process.

Status level
Every player strives to raise their status level by scoring status points by such actions as winning duels, winning at gambling, being a member of a club, visiting a better club as a guest, and winning titles.  Another way to gain status is to buy a commission as an officer in a regiment, take part in military battles and get mentioned in despatches.  Government appointments are a safer but slower way to gain status points.

Dueling
If a character meets another character from a rival regiment while dining, at a club or gambling, a duel will result.  Each duelist writes down a series of actions such as jumping back, slashing, lunging and kicking. The two duelists reveal their maneuvers, and each action is compared to see how they interact. For example, if one duelist attempts to lunge, while the other duelist has jumped back, there is no contact. But if one comes to a stop after an action and the other slashes, then contact is made and damage is calculated. This continues until one duelist either surrenders or is killed.

Publication history 
Game Designers' Workshop got its start in the role-playing game field with En Garde! (1975), designed by Darryl Hany, Frank Chadwick and Paul Evans and published as a 48-page digest-sized book in 1975, with a revised edition in 1977. David M. Ewalt, in his book Of Dice and Men, commented that En Garde! was one of the first early competing products in the role-playing game field to TSR's Dungeons & Dragons, describing it as "a role-playing game set in seventeenth-century France that emphasized man-to-man sword fighting. Players responded to the Three Musketeers-style setting, but they didn't care for the rules." Frank Chadwick designed this swashbuckling game as a hybrid of role-playing game and strategy game.

In the 1980s the game had become widely played by mail but GDW did not reprint it when stocks were exhausted. Theo Clarke and Evans ran a game for over 20 players at the UK Gamesfair in 1983. Evans then wrote a BASIC computer program to administer the game and they ran increasingly large games at successive games fairs. Evans started a postal game using the same computer programs in 1986 in a new magazine called Small Furry Creatures Press, which he co-published with Clarke. Evans continues to run this game as Les Petites Bêtes Soyeuses. The success of the game also led to an annual convention which ran for over ten years.

Clarke and Evans found a demand for the rule book arising from their games and other postal games. Under the name SFC Press they intended to publish a new edition of the game under license from Chadwick. When SFC Press was liquidated in 2003 the rights to the game were acquired by Evans personally. Evans' company Margam Evans produced a new edition, the 4th, of the game.

Although the 1987 Swedish product En Garde! by Ragnarök Speldesign is also a role-playing game set in seventeenth-century France that emphasizes fencing, it has no connection to this game.

Reception
In Issue 55 of the UK magazine Games & Puzzles (December 1976), Charles Vasey noted that GDW "have picked a really splendid period for the new duelling game." However, Vasey questioned the game system, saying, "Despite its complexity, the system does not play as well as one might think. Often duels end very swiftly." He concluded, "It is complex and convoluted, and it feels like real life. Players will soon find they have natural enemies and rivals who must be crushed directly or by a hired blade. One must seek to be in the best set, but beware bankruptcy or it's the frontier regiment and disgrace until you pay off your debts."

In the inaugural issue of Games International, Richard Ashley reviewed the republished edition by Small Furry Creatures Press, and was impressed by its improved layout, as well as the new chapter on postal play. He concluded by giving this game an above-average rating of 4 out of 5, saying, "This new edition retains all the old rules with a superior presentation."

In the 1980 book The Complete Book of Wargames, game designer Jon Freeman thought "the game's limited scope (no monsters, no magic, no hoards of treasure) will keep it from challenging Dungeons & Dragons, but it makes a delightful change of pace." Freeman concluded by giving the game an Overall Evaluation of "Good", saying, "except for Melee and Wizards, it's the only RPG you could imagine running concurrently with your major campaign on, say, alternate Tuesdays."

In The Guide to Simulations/Games for Education and Training, Martin Campion called the game "a tongue-in-cheek simulation of the kind of life lived in The Three Musketeers and other historical adventures." Campion emphasized the open-ended nature of the game by concluding "No criteria for ending the game are included in the rules."

Reviews
Fantastic Science Fiction v27 n10

References

External links
 Official website

Frank Chadwick games
Game Designers' Workshop games
Historical role-playing games
Historical Swashbuckler role-playing games
Indie role-playing games
Role-playing games introduced in 1975